A  (Commentator), in Indian linguistics and philosophy, is a person who wrote a critical commentary or a gloss on a given grammatical or philosophical work.

Monier Williams Dictionary defines Vārttikakāra as a composer of vārttikas. A vārttika is defined as a single remark or a whole work attempting to present a detailed commentary. According to the Indian tradition, the purpose of a vārttika is to enquire into what has been said (ukta), what has not been said (anukta), and what has not been said clearly (durukta).

Famous Vārttikakāras
 Sureśvara is the commentator of the Advaita Vedanta school. His famous commentaries include the Bŗhadāraņyakopanişad-bhāşya-vārttika and the Taittirīya-vārttika.
 Katyayana is identified as the Vārttikakāra of Indian linguistics, who wrote commentaries on 's .

References

Indian philosophy
Vyakarana